"Charles" is a short story by Shirley Jackson, first published in Mademoiselle in July 1948. It was later included in her 1949 collection, The Lottery and Other Stories, and her 1953 novel, Life Among the Savages.

Plot summary
In the story, a mother laments that her "sweet-voiced nursery-school tot" is growing up. She notes changes in his behavior: He doesn't want to wear corduroy overalls anymore, and no longer waves goodbye to her, then slams the door when he comes home from kindergarten / school, and speaks insolently to his father. During lunchtime conversations, Laurie begins telling his parents stories about an ill-behaved boy in his class named Charles, who frequently misbehaves. Though in a way fascinated by the strange boy, the narrating mother wonders if Charles' bad influence is responsible for Laurie misbehaving. Over the ensuing weeks, Charles seems to be going from bad to worse until one day at the beginning of the week Laurie tells his parents that Charles behaved himself and that the teacher made him her helper.  By the end of the week, however, Laurie claims that Charles has reverted to his old self when he makes a girl in his class say a bad word to the teacher.  The next school day, Charles mumbles the word several times to himself and throws chalk. When the next PTA meeting rolls around, Laurie's mother is determined to meet Charles' mother. She closely examines the other parents and sees nothing but pleasant faces and is surprised when Charles is not mentioned at all.  After the meeting, she approaches the teacher and introduces herself as Laurie's mother.  The teacher says that Laurie "had a little trouble adjusting...but now he's a fine little helper.  With occasional lapses, of course." Laurie's mother then mentions Charles and the teacher tells her that there is no one in the class named Charles.

Interpretations
The most common interpretation of "Charles" is that Laurie is Charles, and simply created the character to explain why he stayed late after school. Ruth Franklin, in Shirley Jackson: A Rather Haunted Life, notes that an alternative interpretation is that Charles is a supernatural being that only Laurie can see.

Legacy
The story continues to be taught in schools, and is Jackson's second best-known short story, after "The Lottery".

References

1948 short stories
Short stories by Shirley Jackson
Works originally published in Mademoiselle (magazine)